Jamrūd (Pashto/) or Jam is a town in the Khyber District of Khyber Pakhtunkhwa, Pakistan. Located in the Valley of Peshawar, on the western fringe of Peshawar city, Jamrud is the doorway to the Khyber Pass which is just to the west of the town. The pass connects Jamrud with Landi Kotal to the west, located near the border of Afghanistan's Nangarhar Province.

Jamrud has remained a location on the trade route between Central Asia and South Asia, and a strategic military location.

History
The Battle of Jamrud between the Sikh Empire and Durrani Empire took place at Jamrud where the Sikh general Hari Singh Nalwa was killed and Sikh expansion halted. The famous Jamrud Fort was also built in 54 days by Hari Singh Nalwa. The proposal to build the fort was issued to him by one of his generals. The proposal was opposed; however he finally decided to build the fort and construct its layout. The foundation of the fort that has survived was laid by General Hari Singh Nalwa on 18 December 1836 and the construction was completed in 54 days. The fort was finished on 10 February 1837. Hari Singh Nalwa's grave is still next to the fort where his cremated ashes remain. Jamrud was a strategic location and served as a base for a cantonment of the British Indian Army during the period of the British Raj. It was mainly used by the British army as a base of operations for their wars in Afghanistan. During the military operations of 1878-79 Jamrud became a place of considerable importance as the frontier outpost on British territory towards Afghanistan, and it was also the base of operations for a portion of the Tirah campaign in 1897-1898. It was also the headquarters of the Khyber Rifles, and the collecting station for the Khyber tolls. The place is currently now the headquarters of the Frontier Corps, a branch of the Pakistan Army. The population in 1901 was 1,848. In 2017, the population was recorded to be 63,843 and the place continues to be of strategic significance.

See also
Peshawar
North West Frontier Province
Pakistan
Khyber Pass

Notes

References
 Jamrūd - Imperial Gazetteer of India, v. 14, p. 52.    http://dsal.uchicago.edu/reference/gazetteer/pager.html?objectid=DS405.1.I34_V14_058.gif
 North-West Frontier Province - Imperial Gazetteer of India, v. 19, p. 153. http://dsal.uchicago.edu/reference/gazetteer/pager.html?objectid=DS405.1.I34_V19_159.gif
Gazetteer of the Peshawar District 1897-8, revised edition, Lahore: Punjab Government, p. 74.
 
 The Return of the King by William Dalrymple  https://www.amazon.com/Return-King-Battle-Afghanistan-1839-42/dp/0307958280

External links
 Battle of Jamrud (1837)

Populated places in Khyber District